Maoam is a brand of sweets produced by the German confectionery company Haribo. The product name is a century old. The product consists of chewy fruit-flavoured candy in various flavours. A packet of Maoam sweets usually includes five pieces of a particular flavour, and several of these packets are stacked into a stick which is then sold. The sweets are also available in larger packages. Maoams contain gelatine.

History

Edmund Münster took over the "Düsseldorfer Lakritzenwerk" in 1900. The company primarily produced liquorice candy until the 1930s; in 1930 or 1931 Münster acquired a licence from abroad to produce a chewy fruity candy under the name "Maoam". The name of the product is an invention, and the abbreviation of "" (Everyone, without exception, likes it, in German). In August 1930 Münster received a "utility model for the product Maoam, a chewy candy without chewing gum, made of sugar, syrup and other ingredients" from Düsseldorf. The model covers the name Maoam, the product, the package and any imitation made of liquorice, cocoa, sugar or bakery products.

At the same time Edmund Münster GmbH & Co. started producing the candy, which was wrapped in wax paper.

Edmund Münster offered Maoam to his customers for the first time on Easter 1931. The characteristic Maoam palindrome and ambigram logo had already been invented at this time, which has only slightly changed to this day. There soon appeared imitations of these chewy candies, which was to be expected from the success of the product. After the war, Münster resumed production of the candies. 

In 1986 the confectionery company Haribo from Bonn bought the production and rights to the Maoam candy.

From 1930 to 1982 the candy was produced on Hildebrandtstraße at the Friedrichstadt district of Düsseldorf; it has been later produced at the old  factory on Jülicher Landstraße in Neuss.

Advertisements

A popular slogan used in Maoam advertisements is "Was wollt ihr denn?!" (German for "What do you want then?!"). In the advertisements, a group of people are asked what they want next, for example the audience at a football match or at a large television broadcast. The people are always given two options (for example "Do you want extra time?" - "Do you want a penalty shootout?") After both options have been answered with a loud "No!", the follow-up question is "What do you want then?", which the audience answers with a loud cry of "Maoam, Maoam..." The football referee Walter Eschweiler used to star in these advertisements.

The former volleyball Bundesliga champion  changed their name to Maoam Mendig per sponsorship from 2003 to 2005.

In 2016 Maoam launched the full on till its gone campaign in UK where a guy dances bizarrely.

References

External links
 

German confectionery
Products introduced in 1900
Products introduced in 1931
1986 mergers and acquisitions